Momal Sheikh is a Pakistani actress and producer. Her works in serials are Yeh Zindagi Hai in 2008 and Mirat Ul Uroos in 2013. She made her film debut with 2016 film Happy Bhag Jayegi. Sheikh also co-produced 2018 film Wujood with Shehzad Sheikh under her father production banner Javed Sheikh films which features Danish Taimoor and Saeeda Imtiaz in lead.

Personal life 
She is the daughter of actor Javed Sheikh and Zinat Mangi and sister of Shehzad Sheikh, niece of Behroze Sabzwari and Saleem Sheikh and cousin of Shehroz Sabzwari. She is married to Nader Nawaz. They have a son named Ibrahim. Momal Sheikh announced the birth of her daughter who was born on 20 August 2020.

Career 
She has worked in television serials such as Mirat Ul Uroos on Geo TV. She made her Bollywood film debut with Happy Bhaag Jayegi.

Filmography

Film

Television

References

External links 

 
 

Living people
Actresses from Karachi
Pakistani female models
Pakistani television actresses
Pakistani film actresses
21st-century Pakistani actresses
Punjabi people
Sindhi people
1986 births